Marie (died 1215/16) was an abbess of Shaftesbury Abbey during the 12th century, from at least 1181 to 1215. She was the illegitimate daughter of Geoffrey Plantagenet, Count of Anjou, thus the half-sister of Henry II, King of England. It is possible that she is the same person as Marie of France, but it is not known for certain. She became abbess sometime in the 1170s or 1180s and died in 1215 or 1216.

Several charters relating to the abbey in that period bear her name.

In fiction
Matrix is a 2021 historical novel by Lauren Groff about Marie, identifying her with Marie de France and concerning her tenure as abbess.

References

 Studies in the Early History of Shaftesbury Abbey, Dorset County Council, 1999

Abbesses of Shaftesbury
1210s deaths
13th-century English women
13th-century English people
12th-century English women
12th-century English people